The 12th government of Turkey (3 April 1939 – 9 July 1942) governed Turkey during the early years of the Second World War. It is also known as the second Saydam government.

Background 
The government was formed after the general elections held on 26 March. The prime minister was Refik Saydam, secretary general of the Republican People's Party. He was also the prime minister of the previous caretaker government.

The government
In the list below, the cabinet members who served only a part of the cabinet's lifespan are shown in the column "Notes".

Aftermath
Refik Saydam died on 7 July 1942. He is the only prime minister in the history of Turkey who has died while serving as the prime minister. Ahmet Fikri Tüzer served as the acting prime minister for two days, and another cabinet was formed by Şükrü Saracoğlu on 9 July.

References

Cabinets of Turkey
Republican People's Party (Turkey) politicians
1939 establishments in Turkey
1942 disestablishments in Turkey
Cabinets established in 1939
Cabinets disestablished in 1942
Members of the 12th government of Turkey
6th parliament of Turkey
Republican People's Party (Turkey)